Silver RavenWolf (born September 11, 1956), born Jenine E. Trayer, is a best-selling American New Age, Magick and Witchcraft author and lecturer who focuses on Wicca.

Career
RavenWolf received her Third Degree Initiation from a member of the Serpent Stone family, a pagan congregation.  While studying under a British Traditional Witch who claimed to have ties to the International Red Garters in Britain, Silver also became connected with a family lineaged witch who was the last in his line of the tradition. It was this mentorship that prompted the beginning of the Black Forest Circle and Seminary in the 1990s. , The Black Forest Circle and Seminary is an organization that contains hundreds of covens spanning the United States and Canada. 

Until the 2010s, she appeared as a lecturer and workshop facilitator at events in the Neo-Pagan community. She was active in Wiccan anti-discrimination issues. She was also a Powwower, having adopted the Pennsylvania Dutch practice in a neo-Pagan context.

RavenWolf is the author of over 17 books on Wicca and Paganism in general.  She has also written several novels. Currently, her books have been translated into Czech, Spanish, Italian, German, Russian, Hungarian, Dutch and Portuguese. She is the director of the Wiccan/Pagan Press Alliance Midnight Drive.

Bibliography

Nonfiction 

American Folk Magick: Charms, Spells & Herbals (1999) Llewellyn Publications , 
Angels: Companions in Magick (2002) Llewellyn Publications , 
Halloween: Spells, Recipes & Customs (1999) Llewellyn Publications , 
HedgeWitch: Spells, Crafts & Rituals For Natural Magick (2008) Llewellyn Publications , 
Hex Craft: Dutch Country Pow-wow Magick (1997) Llewellyn Publications , 
Journey of Souls: Case Studies of Life Between Lives by Michael Newton (introduction by Silver Ravenwolf) (2002) Llewellyn Publications , 
Mindlight: Secrets of Energy, Magick & Manifestation (2006) Llewellyn Publications , 
Silver's Spells for Abundance (2004) Llewellyn Publications , 
Silver's Spells for Love (2001) Llewellyn Publications , 
Silver's Spells for Protection (2000) Llewellyn Publications , 
TeenWitch!: Wicca for a New Generation (1998)  Llewellyn Publications , 
To Light a Sacred Flame: Practical Witchcraft for the Millennium (2002) Llewellyn Publications , 
To Ride a Silver Broomstick: New Generation Witchcraft (2002) Llewellyn Publications , 
To Stir a Magick Cauldron: A Witch's Guide to Casting and Conjuring (2005) Llewellyn Publications , 
Solitary Witch: The Ultimate Book of Shadows for the New Generation (2003) Llewellyn Publications , 
Witches Runes: Insights from the Old European Magickal Traditions (Cards) (with Nigel Jackson) (2002) Llewellyn Publications , 
A Witch's Notebook: Lessons in Witchcraft (2005) Llewellyn Publications ,

Spanish titles 
Hechizos Para El Amor
Hechizos Para la Prosperidad
Hechizos Para la Proteccion
Jovenes y Brujas: Un Manual Practico de Brujeria Para Jovenes
Montarse en una Escoba de Plata
Como preparar un Caldero Magico
La hora bruja

Hungarian titles 
Tiniboszorkányok

Dutch titles 
Magische Krachten
Het Derde Oog
Sleutel tot het Kwaad
Engelen magische metgezellen

Novels 
Beneath a Mountain Moon (1995) Llewellyn Publications , 
Murder at Witches' Bluff: A Novel of Suspense and Magick (2000) Llewellyn Publications , 

Witches' Chillers series:'Witches' Night Out (2000) Llewellyn Publications , Witches' Night of Fear (2001) Llewellyn Publications , Witches' Key to Terror'' (2001) Llewellyn Publications ,

See also 
 Modern paganism and New Age

Notes

References

 Llewellyn Publications. Author Bio: Silver RavenWolf. Retrieved Jan. 6, 2023.

1956 births
Living people
American occult writers
American Wiccans
R
People from York County, Pennsylvania
Wiccan novelists
Wiccan writers